The Canadian Green Building Awards are a joint program between the Canada Green Building Council and Sustainable Architecture & Building Magazine (SABMag). The Canadian Green Building Awards are awarded annually to both residential and non-residential projects across Canada of excellent and innovative design and execution. Eligible projects range from new construction, existing buildings, interior design projects, and renovations and retrofits. Entry submission kits are available in January of every year, and the judging occurs in March. Winning projects are announced in May, and publicized in the summer issue of SABMag, on the SABMag and the CaGBC website, and at the CaGBC National Conference.

Jury 
The Canadian Green Building Awards typically has a jury of 4 people who work in the architecture industry, specializing in sustainability and energy efficiency. These jury members change annually.

Notable Projects 
The Canadian Green Building Awards chooses notable projects of all different uses from all around Canada.

2015 Winners

2016 Winners

References

Environmental organizations based in Canada
Sustainable building in Canada
Green Building Councils